Carmen Olarte is a retired Venezuelan voice actress who was the voice of Amelia Wil Tesla Seyruun in Slayers and Meloso in Almendrita in the Latin American version of these anime's. She lives in Washington DC.

Filmography

Anime 
Amelia - Slayers
Kathy - 
Meloso - Almendrita

Animation 
Fifi - Tiny Toons
Pimientosa - Histeria!
Jake - Tazmania
Meg - Mega Babies
Super Girl - New Adventures of Superman
Jay Jay - Jay Jay the Jet Plane

External links
 

Venezuelan voice actresses
Living people
People from Washington, D.C.
Venezuelan expatriates in the United States
Year of birth missing (living people)